Frank Edward King (March 7, 1929 – September 25, 2004) was a Canadian professional ice hockey forward who played 10 games in the National Hockey League for the Montreal Canadiens.

References

External links
 

1929 births
2004 deaths
Canadian ice hockey centres
Montreal Canadiens players
Recipients of the Olympic Order
Ice hockey people from Toronto